Fluffy Little Kitten is a series of children's books by British author Robert Bassett, published in 2007 and 2008.

History 
The books in the Fluffy Little Kitten series were originally published as e-books and sold on eBay.  Bassett claims the books were written as a joke to impress his long suffering girlfriend.

Though attracting little attention at publication between late 2007 and early 2008, the books achieved some noteworthiness in January 2009 when mentioned in a column in The Guardian newspaper. The columnist Zoe Williams alluded to the books favorably in a general critique of children's books.

In May 2009 it was announced that CBeebies (the children's arm of the BBC) had commissioned six Fluffy Little Kitten stories for broadcast in the autumn.

The fourth book in the series, Fluffy Little Kitten in Fluffy's Brother was longlisted for the Bookseller/Diagram Prize for Oddest Title of the Year 2009

Common themes

Each book features a small brown kitten called Fluffy, who becomes upset and cries, usually because of a very minor problem. Once he calms down and his situation is explained to him fully he cheers up and, in the closing page of each book, "everything works out alright in the end."

List of books
Following is a list of published book titles with associated summaries of their texts.

References

External links
 Fluffy Little Kitten official site
 Fluffy Little Kitten's Encyclopedia of kitten facts
 Fluffy Little Kitten's Blog

British picture books
2000s children's books
Books about cats